Harlem High School is a public high school in Harlem, Georgia, United States, in Columbia County.

The school had a shooting incident in 1993, in which one student was killed and another was injured.

The school's teams compete as the Bulldogs.

Aviator Joseph C. Miles graduated from Harlem High School in 1943, as did former Georgia State Representative Robin L. Williams

The school features a diversity of clubs, including Beta Club, National Honors Society, Science Club, and Health Occupation Students of America (HOSA).

Sports
 Baseball
 Basketball
 Cheer (football, basketball, competition)
 Cross country
 Football
 Golf
 Raider color guard, drill team (Army JROTC)
 Soccer
 Softball
 Tennis
 Track and field
 Volleyball
 Wrestling

References

3. https://harlemhs.ccboe.net/#

Public high schools in Georgia (U.S. state)
High schools in Columbia County, Georgia